Symbel is an English heathen metal rock band, created in 2001 by Sceot Acwealde (also Bretwaldas of Heathen Doom and Herne), fusing lyrical elements of the English neopagan, anti-capitalist and esoteric anarchist circles with folkish and romanticist nationalist beliefs, drawing from the philosophies suggested in the Anglo-Saxon and Old Norse texts.

Releases
The debut CD was released in January 2003 by Angelisc Enterprises, the label run by Forefather, now called Seven Kingdoms. Subsequent work has been released by King Penda Productions and Midhir Records. 

Heathen Drinking Metal; 27 minutes four track demos 2001 / 02
We Drink - Hymns and Counsel of Anglo-Saxon Heathenry; CD 2003 36 minutes
"Wet English Forests"; 10" vinyl 45rpm 2004 - re-release of selected demo material. 
Ale Whores of Mercia; CD May 2007
Gyddigg - Possessed by the Rage of Wod; CD 2013
Hammerwych; EP August 2014 

King Penda Productions has made available these releases as digital downloads at Bandcamp.

Members
Sceot Acwealde - vocals, all instruments.

References

Interviews
METAL COVEN   - MAY 2004
FROM BELOW      - MAR 2004
 EXPLOSION CEREBRAL  - OCT 2003
METALIRELAND     - JUNE 2003
LORDSOFMETAL     - MAR 2003

External links
Official homepage

English rock music groups
Modern pagan musical groups
Modern paganism in the United Kingdom